Max Born was a widely influential German physicist and mathematician who was awarded the 1954 Nobel Prize in Physics for his pivotal role in the development of quantum mechanics. Born won the prize primarily for his contributions to the statistical interpretation of the wave function, though he is known for his work in several areas of quantum mechanics as well as solid-state physics, optics, and special relativity. Born's entry in the Biographical Memoirs of Fellows of the Royal Society included thirty books and 330 papers.

Books 
Born wrote several textbooks and popular science books throughout his career, including Dynamical Theory of Crystal Lattices and Principles of Optics.

English editions

German editions

Articles

Sole author in English

Collaborations in English

Collaborations in German

Sole author in German

Reviews

Biographical

Collections

Interviews

American Institute of Physics 
Born was interviewed several times by the American Institute of Physics.

Letters

Translations 

(BMFRS25) The book Klecksel the painter was published 1965 by the Frederick Ungar Publishing Company as a translation of Klecksel der Maler by Wilhelm Busch.

(BMFRS343) Born translated Wilhelm Busch's poem "" into English in 1962.

Reference works edited

See also 

 Bibliography of E. T. Whittaker
 List of scientific publications by Albert Einstein
 List of important publications in physics
 List of textbooks on classical mechanics and quantum mechanics
 List of textbooks in thermodynamics and statistical mechanics
 List of textbooks in electromagnetism

Primary sources

Publications

Reviewed works

References

Further reading

External links 
 
 
 

Max Born
Born, Max
Born, Max